Wangfang Town is an urban town in Liling City, Zhuzhou City, Hunan Province, People's Republic of China.

Cityscape
The town is divided into 10 villages and 2 communities, the following areas: Qiaotou Community, Sanjiaoping Community, Lianmeng Village, Wangfang Village, Hehualong Village, Guanchong Village, Wenquan Village, Shishan Village, Banchuan Village, Daping Village, Yanglin Village, and Lushi Village (桥头社区、三角坪社区、联盟村、王坊村、荷花垅村、灌冲村、温泉村、石山村、泮川村、大屏村、杨林村、渌石村).

External links

Historic township-level divisions of Liling